Shooting competitions at the 2019 Pan American Games in Lima, Peru are scheduled to be held between August 8 and 10, 2019 at the Las Palmas Air Base.

15 medal events are scheduled to be contested. Six for men, six for women and three mixed gender events. The men's 50 m pistol, men's 50 m rifle and men's double trap events have been dropped in favour of three mixed gender events. This was done after the International Olympic Committee pushed for gender equal events across all sports. A total of 256 sport shooters will qualify to compete at the games.

The top two shooters, not already qualified, in each individual event will qualify for the 2020 Summer Olympics in Tokyo, Japan.

Medal table

Medalists

Men's events

Women's events

Mixed pairs events

Qualification

A total of 256 sport shooters will qualify to compete. Each nation may enter a maximum of 24 athletes (two per each individual event). There will be three qualification events for shooters to qualify. There will be no quotas awarded for the mixed events, as nations must use already qualified athletes to compete in them. As host nation, Peru will get a quota of six athletes (two per each discipline, and can qualify more) and there will also be two wild cards awarded to nations not qualified.

See also
Shooting at the 2019 Parapan American Games
Shooting at the 2020 Summer Olympics

References

External links
Results book

 
Events at the 2019 Pan American Games
Pan American Games
2019